Francisco "Paco" Peña Romero (born 25 July 1978) is a Spanish footballer who plays as a left-back.

He spent most of his professional career with Hércules, playing 316 competitive matches while representing the club in all three major levels of Spanish football. He totalled 128 appearances in La Liga over four seasons, where he also played for Albacete and Murcia.

Club career
Born in Jerez de los Caballeros, Extremadura, Peña started his career with local Jerez CF, for whom he appeared in Segunda División B. During the 1999 January transfer window, he signed with fellow league club Levante UD, contributing 15 appearances to an eventual promotion.

After a further three seasons with the team, Peña joined Albacete Balompié also in division two. He played 24 matches in 2002–03, and the latter returned to La Liga after an absence of seven years.

Peña made his debut in the Spanish top flight on 30 August 2003, playing the full 90 minutes in a 0–2 home loss against CA Osasuna. He was sent off in the next fixture at the Estadio Carlos Belmonte (1–2 defeat to FC Barcelona) and, at the end of the following campaign, again with him as an undisputed starter, his team was relegated.

In summer 2006, Peña moved to Real Murcia from the second tier. During his three-year tenure he only missed a total of 14 games, and also competed in the top division in 2007–08.

Aged 31, Peña signed with Hércules CF in 2009 off-season. He went on to remain connected with the Alicante-based club for more than one decade, representing it in all three major levels of Spanish football and acting as team captain. He scored his first competitive goal for them – and second as a professional – on 24 March 2013, in a 2–0 away win over CD Guadalajara.

References

External links

1978 births
Living people
People from Sierra Suroeste
Sportspeople from the Province of Badajoz
Spanish footballers
Footballers from Extremadura
Association football defenders
La Liga players
Segunda División players
Segunda División B players
Tercera División players
Divisiones Regionales de Fútbol players
Levante UD footballers
Albacete Balompié players
Real Murcia players
Hércules CF players
CF Intercity players